Brie is a commune in the department of Aisne in Hauts-de-France in northern France.

Council
Since the number of inhabitants of the commune is less than 100, the number of members of the municipal council is 7. The current mayor is Jack Guillaucourt, elected in 2020.

Population

In 2017, the commune had 53 inhabitants, a decrease of 23% compared to 1999.

See also
Communes of the Aisne department

References

Communes of Aisne
Aisne communes articles needing translation from French Wikipedia